Audrey Napoleon is an American electronic music producer, DJ and entrepreneur. Napoleon moved to Los Angeles in 2005, launched her DJ career in 2008 and is both the founder and CEO of Gostrider. Napoleon lives in New York City.

Creative direction 

Between 2011 and 2013, Napoleon created a short film for her single "Poison", co-directing the styling and makeup.

In 2012, Napoleon collaborated with The Rodnik Brand. Napoleon starred in the campaign, as well as advising on Creative and Art Direction. This campaign was featured in Italian Vogue and Nylon Magazine.

Between 2013 and 2015, Napoleon starred in award-winning V-Moda M100 headphones campaign, advised in Creative Direction as well as Makeup and Styling. This campaign was featured in American Vogue.

In 2014, Napoleon was unveiled as Ardency Inn's new eyeliner headliner. The Modster eyeliner kits included Ardency Inn's eyeliner in black, blue, and gold. With her Ardency Inn campaign, Napoleon joined only Nervo as dance music artists with cosmetics contracts (the duo has been signed with Cover Girl since 2012).

Founder and CEO of Gostrider

2019–present 

Napoleon launched Gostrider in 2020 aiming at offering a direct-to-consumer approach to launching beauty brands for music artists.

Discography

Singles
2010: "This is Fucking Techno" (Circuit Freq Records)
2011: "Group Games" (Death Proof Recordings)
2011: "Mission: Sleep" (Death Proof Recordings)
2011: "Bird Lynch" (Circuit Freq Records)
2011: "Foxy Boxy" (SQE Music)
2012: "Banana Soda Es Muy Loca" (SQE Music)
2012: "#MySunrise" (SQE Music) (Heineken #MySunrise Ad) (Triple Platinum, Cannes Lion Award, Piaf Award)
2012: "Green +15" (SQE Music)
2013: "Dope A La Mode" (SQE Music)
2017: "Breathe" (Datacode Records)
2018: "Dope A La Mode (2018)" (Independent Records)

EPs
2012: Ornamental Egos (SQE Music)

Remixes
2011: D. Ramirez – "Everybody Has the Right" (Toolroom Records)
2013: C.C. Sheffield – "Long Brown Hair" (Ultra Records)
2014: Filter – "Surprise" (Wind-up Records)
2014: Le Castle Vania – "Disintegration" (mau5trap)
2015: Colette Carr – "Static" (Kawaii Nation)

Mixed compilations
2010: Death Techno 015 (Death Techno)
2012: Prospects (Death Proof Recordings)
2013: Keep It Death Proof (Death Proof Recordings)

References

External links

American DJs
Club DJs
Women DJs
American electronic musicians
Female models from California
American house musicians
American techno musicians
Record producers from Texas
American women singer-songwriters
American people of Italian descent
Living people
Year of birth missing (living people)
People from Houston
Musicians from Los Angeles
Remixers
American women in electronic music
Singer-songwriters from California
Singer-songwriters from Texas
Electronic dance music DJs
Record producers from California
American women record producers
21st-century American women